Mawa may refer to:
 Mentoring Artists for Women's Art. This organization encourages and supports the intellectual and creative development of women in the visual arts.
 Mawa, Bangladesh
 Mawa clawed frog, a species of frog endemic to Cameroon
 Mawa Gare, a village and former railway station in the Democratic Republic of the Congo
 Orang Mawas, a proposed hominid cryptid reported to inhabit the jungle of Johor in Malaysia
 Mawa language (Chad),
 Mawa language (Nigeria), an unclassified language
 Khoa, a milk product also known as Mawa